Wetzikon is a small town in the Zurich Highlands (Zürcher Oberland) area of Switzerland, in the district of Hinwil in the canton of Zürich.

Geography

Of this area, 42.4% is used for agricultural purposes, while 17.6% is forested. Of the rest of the land, 27.9% is settled (buildings or roads) and the remainder (12.1%) is non-productive (streams, lakes and non-productive vegetation).   housing and buildings made up 20% of the total area, while transportation infrastructure made up the rest (7.9%). Of the total unproductive area, water (streams and lakes) made up 3.3% of the area.   30.5% of the total municipal area was undergoing some type of construction.

It is located near Lake Pfäffikon in the Zürcher Oberland, between Uster and Rapperswil-Jona.

Demographics
, 22.1% of the population was made up of foreign nationals.   the gender distribution of the population was 49.2% male and 50.8% female. Over the last 10 years the population has grown at a rate of 18.8%. Most of the population speaks German  (83.8%), with Italian being second most common ( 5.7%) and Albanian being third ( 1.9%).

In the 2007 election the most popular party was the SVP which received 37.6% of the vote.  The next three most popular parties were the SPS (16.1%), the CSP (12.2%) and the Green Party (10.5%).

The age distribution of the population is children and teenagers (0–19 years old) make up 23.1% of the population, while adults (20–64 years old) make up 62% and seniors (over 64 years old) make up 15%.  There are 7929 households in Wetzikon.

 there were 6385 Catholics and 7772 Protestants in Wetzikon. From the 2000 census, 45% were some type of Protestant, with 40.3% belonging to the Swiss Reformed Church and 4.7% belonging to other Protestant churches.  31.3% of the population were Catholic. Of the rest of the population, 6.5% were Muslim, 8.7% belonged to another religion (not listed), 3.6% did not give a religion, and 10.6% were atheist or agnostic.

Economics and education 
The Kantonschule Zürcher Oberland (KZO), or the "Kanti" as the gymnasium level learning institution is known in Swiss German, is based in Wetzikon due to its central location in the Zürich Oberland, as well as the Zürcher Oberländer newspaper and the annual ZOM trade fair.

The regional hospital, the Gesundheitsversorgung Zürcher Oberland  is also located there.

Wetzikon has an unemployment rate of 2.9%.  , there were 134 people employed in the primary economic sector and about 41 businesses involved in this sector.  3486 people are employed in the secondary sector and there are 255 businesses in this sector.  7054 people are employed in the tertiary sector, with 838 businesses in this sector.   43.8% of the working population were employed full-time, and 56.2% were employed part-time.

In Wetzikon about 69.4% of the population (between age 25-64) have completed either non-mandatory upper secondary education or additional higher education (either university or a Fachhochschule).

World heritage site
The prehistoric settlement Wetzikon–Robenhausen at the Robenhausen wetland which was discovered and researched by Jakob Messikommer is part of the serial site Prehistoric Pile dwellings around the Alps, an UNESCO World Heritage Site.

Transportation 
There are two railway stations within the municipality. Wetzikon railway station is a node of the Zürich S-Bahn on the lines S3, S14, S15 and S5. Kempten railway station is on the S3 line only. The town is a 20-minute (S5) ride from Zürich Hauptbahnhof.

Gallery

History 

The oldest surviving document about the name Wetzikon is from the year 1044, where three nobles of "Wezzinchova" are mentioned; before that the village and castle were known by the name Ratpoldskilch. Older history is known from excavations of prehistoric pile dwellings in Robenhausen and a Roman villa rustica in Kempten.

Sights 
 The local museum (Ortsmuseum) documents the cultural history from the Neolithic Age until the 21st century 
 Robenhauser Riet
 Kemptner Tobel

Notable persons 

 Elisabeth of Wetzikon (1235-1298) imperial abbess of the Fraumünster abbey 1270-1298
 Johannes Schmidlin (1722-1772) pastor and composer
 Hans Georg Nägeli (1773-1836) composer and music publisher
 Heinrich Leuthold (1827-1879) poet and translator
 Jakob Messikommer (1828-1917) wetland archaeologist, researched the settlement at Robenhausen
 Jakob Heusser (1862–1941) industrialist and philanthropist
 Hedi Lang (1931-2004) politician, second woman to preside in the Swiss National Council
 Jörg Schneider (1935-2015) stage and film actor 
 Walter Andreas Müller (born 1945) stage and film actor, radio host and comedian 
 Ueli Maurer (born 1950), politician, member of the Swiss Federal Council
 Eric Franklin (born 1957) dancer, movement educator, university lecturer and writer
 Patrick Mohr (born 1971) former professional tennis player
 Andreas Schweizer (born 1979) gymnast 
 Dorothee Elmiger (born 1985), writer
 Steven Deana (born 1990) football goalkeeper currently playing for FC Aarau
 Natalie Kanyapak Phoksomboon (born 1991) Thai-Swiss beauty queen, won Miss Thailand World 2013

References

External links 

  
 Community website 

 
Municipalities of the canton of Zürich
Cities in Switzerland
Pfäffikersee